Barbara Anne Frawley (14 April 1935 – 1 March 2004) was an Australian actress, voice artist and children's TV host. 

She is best known as the voice of young Dot in the 1977 film adaptation of Dot and the Kangaroo, as well as Around the World with Dot and Dot and the Bunny. Apart from the films she appeared in with the Yoram Gross Film Studios, she mainly appeared in cameo and additional voiceover roles.

Biography
Frawley originally was a radio actress in the late 1950s with the ABC, appearing on The Children's Session before moving to television, where she appeared in the 1967 TV drama series, Contrabandits and in the 1970s in The Link Men, Spyforce and Homicide. Frawley also appeared on episodes of the Australian children's television show, Play School.

Frawley went on to provide the voices for many characters in various Australian animated films and television movies, mainly for Yoram Gross Film Studios, most notably in Dot and the Kangaroo and most recently in The Camel Boy. Frawley, late of North Bondi, died in Sydney on 1 March 2004.

Filmography 
 Dot and the Smugglers (1987)
 The Adventures of Huckleberry Finn (1984) – Additional voices
 The Camel Boy (1984) – Additional voices 
 Dot and the Bunny (1983) – Dot 
 Great Expectations (1983) – Additional voices
 A Christmas Carol (1982) – Additional voices
 Oliver Twist (1982) – Additional voices
 Around the World with Dot (1981) – Dot 
 The Little Convict (1979) – Polly
 Dot and the Kangaroo (1977) – Dot 
 A Journey to the Center of the Earth (1977) – Additional voices
 Moby Dick (1977) – Additional voices
 Silent Night, Holy Night (1976) – Additional voices 
 The Black Arrow (1973) – Additional voices
 The Three Musketeers (1973) – Additional voices
 The Count of Monte Cristo (1973) – Additional voices
 The Swiss Family Robinson (1972) – Additional voices
 The Prince and the Pauper (1972) – Additional voices

Television series filmography

 Play School (1980-1992) – Presenter – Songs so far: The Black Cat since 1980
 The Fourth Wish (TV miniseries)
 Number 96 (1973) - Nursing Sister
 Behind the Legend (1972)  (TV series) 
 Spyforce (1972) -  Mrs. Wilson
 Woobinda, Animal Doctor  Miss. Webber
 The Link Men (1970) - Carol Johnson
 Contrabandits (1967) - Cisca 
 Homicide (1966–1972) – Val Charter
 Consider Your Verdict (1961) Mary Ann Harmon

References

External links
 Barbara Frawley at IMDb

Australian film actresses
Australian television actresses
Australian voice actresses
2004 deaths
Australian children's television presenters
1935 births
Australian women television presenters